Ugallu, the "Big Weather-Beast", (Sumerian inscribed 𒌓𒃲𒆷/UD.GAL.LA, Akkadian: ūmu rabû, meaning "big day"), was a lion-headed storm-demon and has the feet of a bird who is featured on protective amulets and apotropaic yellow clay or tamarisk figurines of the first millennium BC but had its origins in the early second millennium. The iconography changed over time, with the human feet morphing into an eagle's talons and dressing him in a short skirt. He was one of the class of ud-demons (day-demons), personifying moments of divine intervention in human life.

Function

As an ud-demon, Ugallu's function is to intervene in moments of disaster in a person's life, such as saving them from death. His affiliation with the day compares him with other light related deities, Shamash the sun, the star of Sirius, and Nuska, god of the lamp. Many of his rituals as described are to be performed at night.

Iconography

His iconography has notably shifted over time.

The Neo-Assyrian versions have eagle talons, and a short skirt. His weapons are the dagger and the mace, with the dagger raised above his head in a threatening manner. Two recovered amulets differ from this, with the same lion-headed Ugallu but with human feet and a long robe. This latter version seems to be quite rare, with the former version being much more common.

Mythology

Ugallu was one of the eleven mythical monsters created by Tiāmat in her conflict with the younger gods, on the reverse of the first tablet of the Epic of Creation, Enûma Eliš. The tale describes how Marduk captured and bound the creatures, rehabilitating them with work reconstructing the world from the corpses of his vanquished adversaries. This transformed them into protective charms which would be used to adorn the doors of palaces, for example that of Ashurbanipal's southwest palace at Nineveh, temples, such as the Esagila of the Marduk temple as described in the Agum-Kakrime Inscription, and private dwellings (the bedrooms of the vulnerable) to ward off evil and disease.

Sometimes in pairs of ugallū, the beneficial protective demon finds special purpose in adorning the outer gates of buildings.

Ugallu first appears figuratively in the First Babylonian dynasty as a porter of the underworld, a servant of Nergal. In later times he is represented on amulets as frequently paired with the Sumerian demon Lulal, who was in many respects fairly similar in appearance. He is portrayed clasping a dagger, and described thus: "a lion's head and lion's ears, it holds a ... in its right hand and carries a mace  (𒄑𒆪gišTUKUL) in its left, it is girded with a dagger, its name is ugallu."

References

Bibliography

 
 

Characters in the Enūma Eliš
Mesopotamian legendary creatures
Mesopotamian demons
Offspring of Tiamat
Sky and weather gods
Wolves in folklore, religion and mythology
Mythological hybrids